Admiral is an English sportswear brand, with a manufacturing emphasis on clothing for association football. Founded in 1914 in Leicester, Admiral is one of the oldest sports brands in the UK and was originally an undergarment brand but switched to the manufacture of apparel for sports that have included cricket, cycling and athletics, as well as football. The Admiral logo was formally registered with the trademark office on 6 September 1922. The company reached the peak of its success in the 1970s, 1980s and early 1990s through a series of football team sponsorships.

Some of the teams most notably sponsored by Admiral were the England national team, Leeds United, Manchester United, Kerala Blasters and some teams of the now-defunct NASL.

The Admiral brand was brought back to life by a Manchester firm established by a local entrepreneur, "Admiral Sportswear Ltd.", which in 2011 acquired rights to manufacture and market footwear, clothing and accessories.

History

Beginning

"Cook & Hurst Ltd.", a Leicester-based manufacturing company of underwear established by Christopher Cook and Harold Hurst in Wigston in 1908, created the 'Admiral' trademark in 1914 to brand their products. When England won the World Cup in 1966, Bert Patrick, the owner of Cook & Hurst Ltd, commenced manufacturing and marketing football kits. The kits sales were aimed at the juvenile market and through selling connections in the sports retail trade. Bert Patrick believed that the advent of coloured television would enable him to persuade football clubs to accept personalised kits which his designers would produce and then register them under the Design Copyright Act. There was stiff opposition to his ideas from all sections of the public.

1970s: Leeds and England
Through its connection with Leeds United, Admiral pioneered the introduction and development of the replica kit market in the UK. In the 1973–74 season, Leeds United wore the first visibly branded kit in the English top flight.

Realising the potential of the replica kit market, Admiral brokered a deal with the Football Association in 1974 to produce the first commercially available England shirt that featured a sportswear manufacturers logo. They agreed a five-year contract for a starting payment of £15,000 a year or a 10 per cent royalty.

Other clubs
Admiral signed up other big clubs alongside Leeds United, such as Manchester United, Coventry City, Portsmouth, Tottenham Hotspur, Southampton, and West Ham. It also developed outside England, signing sides Aberdeen, Dundee and Motherwell in Scotland, Yugoslavian club Red Star Belgrade, Bundesliga outfit Eintracht Frankfurt, the Italian clubs Bologna and Monza, the Swiss club Servette, Swedish club Malmö, and the Indian club Kerala Blasters, in addition to the national teams of Belgium, Saudi Arabia and Wales. Admiral also produced kits for many of the NASL teams during the late 1970s and early 1980s, and had a replica licensing deal with some clubs, and for two seasons produced the uniforms for every team in the MISL.

1980s: Decline and rebirth

Admiral began the decade with the launch of a new England kit in 1980, the first new kit in nearly 6 years. This kit was first worn in a 3–1 win over Argentina at Wembley Stadium on 13 May, and lasted until 1983. However, the 1980s marked a period of decline for the Admiral brand, as it began to lose the contracts with the major clubs to domestic rival Umbro and new international entrant Adidas.

Even though Admiral still held the England kit contract, one of the most valuable in the world, the company was declared bankrupt in 1982. The brand reappeared on the market for the 1983–84 season producing the same double pinstripe design for both Leicester City and Notts County. Towards the end of the 1980s Bradford City, Cardiff City, Crystal Palace, Hull City, Swansea City and Wrexham were added to the Admiral roster. It was also the first ever kit maker of Inverness Caledonian Thistle.

1990s
Admiral entered the 1990s well placed to build upon its widespread recognition and continued to supply clubs including Dynamo Kyiv, Southampton, Middlesbrough, Bradford City, Charlton Athletic, Wimbledon, Hearts, Motherwell, Rangers, Partizan Belgrade and many more. In 1992 after Leeds United had won the last Football League division One title before the advent of the Premier League they negotiated a deal to make their kits for the following season.

After a period of relative inactivity during the mid-1990s, the Admiral trademark was acquired by Hay & Robertson plc in 1997, and ownership was transferred to International Brand Licensing plc in a demerger in 2002.

2000 and beyond
In 2000, Admiral entered the world of cricket and was the official kit supplier to the England cricket team until 2008 (the sponsorship was then taken over by Adidas). By 2001, it had also become the kit supplier to the West Indies and South Africa cricket teams as well as supplying the Canadian team for the 2003 Cricket World Cup held in South Africa. However, Admiral kept its connection with English football by sponsoring Leeds United until the end of the 2007–08 season.

In the 2010s, Admiral continues to sponsor a number of football teams around the world.

In 2011, Admiral Sportswear Limited acquired the rights of the Admiral trademark for most of Europe, the Middle East and North Africa, with the intention of revitalizing the heritage sports brand.

In 2016, Wimbledon won promotion to EFL League One wearing Admiral. This is the highest position the club has held in the football league. In Italy Cisalfa Sport have the exclusive licence to retail Admiral Performance and Essentials.

As part of the regeneration project Admiral started to work and collaborate with different design partners. The first of these was with Represent, shown at the 2019 Milan Fashion Week

In September 2020, the "Admiral Sporting Goods Co." line was launched. The line, that took inspiration from pre-1966 sportswear, was composed of t-shirts, hoodies, and accessories. the projects first collaboration was with Acme Whistles the inventors of the first ever pea whistle.

Also that year, the company together with Wellgosh made a special common release.

Sponsorships 
Admiral currently provides kit uniforms for the following teams:

Association football

National teams

Club teams
 
  Radcliffe FC
  Europa Point
  Jubilo Iwata
  SCSA Eagles
  Gremio FC SD
  AC Miracle Hill
  Boca Raton
  Greater Lowell United
  New Orleans Jesters
  Sioux Falls Thunder
  Inter Nashville
  Tyler
  Sonoma County Sol
  Milwaukee Torrent
  Dayton Dynamo
  Demize NPSL
  Kitsap Pumas
  Cleveland
  Jersey Express
  Tri-Cities
  West Virginia Alliance
  Harrisburg Heat
  Corpus Christi
  Austin Bold
  Santa Ana Winds
  Temecula

Players 
 Shota Kaneko

Cricket 
 United States

Golf 
 Satoshi Kodaira
 Nasa Hataoka

Tennis 
 Himari Sato
 Yusuke Futawatari
 Maaya Uno
 Shogo Takano
 Sho Shimabukuro

Music and Showbitz 
  The Reytons
  The Jam
  The Style Council

Former sponsorships

National teams

 
 
 
 
 
  (1974–84)

Club teams 

 Beerschot
 Bolívar
 Vancouver Whitecaps
 Whitecaps
 Aldershot Town
 Barnsley
 Birmingham City
 Bolton Wanderers
 Bradford City
 Brighton & Hove Albion
 Bristol City
 Carlisle United
 Charlton Athletic
 Coventry
 Crystal Palace
 Derby County
 Everton
 Exeter
 Grimsby Town
 Hereford
 Huddersfield
 Hull City
 Leeds United
 Leicester City
 Leyton Orient
 Luton Town
 Manchester United
 Middlesbrough
 Newcastle United
 Notts County
 Norwich
 Oxford United
 Peterborough United
 Plymouth Argyle
 Port Vale
 Portsmouth
 Preston North End
 Queens Park Rangers
 Scunthorpe United
 Sheffield United
 Shrewsbury Town
 Southend United
 Southampton
 Stockport County
 Stoke
 Tottenham Hotspur
 Wallsall
 West Ham United
 AFC Wimbledon
 Wimbledon
 Wolverhampton Wanderers
 York City
 Eintracht Frankfurt
 Panathinaikos
 Almyros F.C.
 Kerala Blasters (2017–2018)
 Rastakhiz
 Beitar Jerusalem
 Hapoel Haddera
 Hapoel Haifa
 Shamrock Rovers
 St Patrick's
 Ascoli
 Aprilia
 Bologna
 Foggia
 Frosinone
 Avispa Fukuoka
 T-Team
 Utrecht
 Dordrecth
 Sparta Rotterdam
 Twente
 De Graafschap
 Portadown F.C.
 Puerto Rico Islanders
 Rangers
 Motherwell
 Aberdeen
 Arbroath
 East Fife
 Dumbarton
 Dundee
 Forfar Athletic
 Hamilton Academical
 Queen's Park F.C.
 Motherwell
 St Johnstone
 St Mirren
 Inverness Caledonian
 Hearts
 Hibernian
 Malmö
 IFK Göteborg
 Servette
 Fenerbahçe
 Trabzonspor
 Dynamo Kyiv
 Crvena Zvezda
 Partizan Belgrade
 California Surf
 New York Cosmos (1979)
 Tampa Bay Rowdies
 Los Angeles Aztecs
 Seattle Sounders
 Houston Hurricanes
 Minnesota Kicks
 Tacoma Stars
 Temecula
 Detroit Express
 Las Vegas Quicksilvers
 Chicago Sting
 Atlanta Chiefs
 Oklahoma City
 Portland Timbers
 Edmonton Drillers
 Philadelphia Fury
 Cardiff
 Swansea
 Wrexham

Cycling
 Ti-Raleigh
 Splendor (cycling team)

Cricket
 Canada
 England
 South Africa
 West Indies

F1
 Minardi F1 Team

Golf
 US Golf Association

Kabaddi
 Tamil Thalaivas

References

External links
 

British brands
Clothing brands of the United Kingdom
Clothing companies of England
British companies established in 1914
Clothing companies established in 1914
Manufacturing companies based in Manchester
Oadby and Wigston
Sporting goods brands
Sporting goods manufacturers of the United Kingdom
Sportswear brands
1914 establishments in England